Osojnik may refer to:

People
Iztok Osojnik, Slovene poet and essayist

Places

In Croatia:
Osojnik, Croatia, a village in Dubrovnik-Neretva County

In Slovenia:
Osojnik, Semič, a settlement in the Municipality of Semič
Osojnik, Železniki, a settlement in the Municipality of Železniki